Parrain is French for godfather.

It may also refer to:

Crime
A synonym for crime boss
Capo dei capi, Italian for "boss of all bosses"
a rank in the Milieu (organized crime in France)

Other uses
 Pierre Parrain (1904–1984) French athlete
 Le Parrain, Valais, Pennine Alps, Switzerland; a mountain
 Parrain, the team mascot of the Houma Hawks
 Groupe scolaire André Parrain, Courdimanche, Val-d'Oise, Île-de-France, France; a primary school

See also

 Godfather (disambiguation)